President of the Legislative Assembly may refer to any of the following presiding officers (speakers) of parliamentary bodies styled legislative assemblies:
 
President of the Legislative Assembly of Macau of the Legislative Assembly of Macau
President of the Legislative Assembly of Costa Rica of the Legislative Assembly of Costa Rica
President of the Legislative Assembly of El Salvador of the Legislative Assembly of El Salvador
President of the Legislative Assembly of the Federal District of the Legislative Assembly of the Federal District

See also
Speaker of the Legislative Assembly